Operation Lifesaver is the largest rail safety organization in the United States. It was founded by the Union Pacific Railroad in the early 1970s.

History
In 1972, the Idaho State Highway Patrol, then-Governor Cecil Andrus and the Union Pacific Railroad mounted campaign to promote "Stop, Look and Listen" safety at highway-rail grade crossings. The initial teams spoke to civic groups, school groups, school bus and truck drivers. Idaho experienced a 43% reduction in fatalities that first year.

Operation Lifesaver has trained instructors and authorized volunteer speakers who provide free rail safety education programs across the U.S. and abroad. They give free presentations to school groups, driver education classes, community members, professional drivers, law enforcement officers, and emergency responders. Their programs are co-sponsored by federal, state and local government agencies, highway safety organizations and America's railroad systems.

Campaigns
In 2006, Operation Lifesaver requested that Disney edit a scene of the Pixar film Cars in which the character of Lightning McQueen races a train to a grade crossing while the crossing lights are flashing. Disney/Pixar removed the scene in question from theater showings, but the DVD release of the movie still included the scene. Disney/Pixar created a series of PSAs featuring Lightning McQueen to promote safe driving habits.

On October 14, 2016, Operation Lifesaver requested via a Facebook post that Hollister Co. remove advertisements from their website showing teenagers walking on railroad tracks. Hollister removed the advertisements five days later on October 19.

In September 2017, Operation Lifesaver spearheaded the observance of Rail Safety Week across the U.S. to raise awareness of the need for caution near railroad tracks and property. 

In 2018, Operation Lifesaver Canada, which had been holding rail safety week observances for years, aligned its Rail Safety Week dates to coincide with the U.S. observance.

Criticism
Operation Lifesaver has been criticized for its strong ties to the railroad industry and the group's skew toward the railroad industry. The industry has reduced its support of the group’s efforts by providing fewer workers to help spread the group’s safety message. The group has also been criticized for not doing enough to support pedestrian railroad safety in the United States.

Images

References

External links 
 
 Operation Lifesaver Canada - Official website

Transportation organizations based in the United States
Level crossings
Public service announcements of the United States
Railway safety
Union Pacific Railroad
1970s establishments in the United States

simple:Non-profit